Intract Australia is an Australian construction and building maintenance contracting company. It was established to provide employment and training opportunities for indigenous Australians. It was established in 2010 as a business unit of McMahon Services. It is now 51% owned, managed and controlled by indigenous people. Intract built the 15 km-long shared path as part of the Northern Connector freeway project in South Australia.

Intract owns some of the equipment it uses, but also has access to a larger pool of earthmoving and other equipment through its parent company, McMahon Services.

References

Construction and civil engineering companies of Australia
Construction and civil engineering companies established in 2010
Australian companies established in 2010